Arthur Brown (born 10 December 1949) is a former Scotland international rugby union player.

Rugby Union career

Amateur career

He played for Gala.

He was part of the Gala 7s side that won the Gala Sevens in 1969 beating Loughborough Colleges in the final; and in 1970, beating Llanelli in the final.

The Gala 7s side of Ken Oliver, Peter Brown, Johnny Brown, Dunc Paterson, Arthur Brown, John Frame and Drew Gill were a notable side. Nicknamed the magnificent seven the Gala 7s won 16 Sevens tournaments between 1970 and 1972.

Provincial career

He played for South of Scotland District.

International career

He was capped 5 times for Scotland.

His first two matches for Scotland were against England, in successive weeks. Scotland beat England twice over those 2 weeks; and it remains the only time that this has happened.

References

External links 
 Arthur Brown on Espn

1949 births
Living people
Gala RFC players
Rugby union players from Galashiels
Scotland international rugby union players
Scottish rugby union players
South of Scotland District (rugby union) players
Rugby union fullbacks